The Covington News is a newspaper serving Covington, Georgia and surrounding Newton County including the towns of Oxford, Porterdale and Social Circle. The newspaper publishes a bi-weekly paper on Sunday and Wednesday.

History
A newspaper called The Georgia Enterprise was first published in 1865, six months after the end of The Civil War, by William L. Beebe.  In 1902, this paper merged with its competitor, The Covington Star, to become The Enterprise under the ownership of Charles G. Smith.

The Enterprise was sold in 1908 to Lon. L. Flowers, and its name was changed to The Covington News.  The newspaper had a number of owners between 1908 and 1931, when it was purchased by Belmont Dennis and his family. During the period from 1953 till 1957 a competing newspaper was born in Covington named "The Citizen Observer" in Conyers named "The Rockdale Citizen" and in Lithonia named "The Lithonia Observer". Those papers competed with the Belmont Dennis publications in each of those cities. The owners of these three papers were William Thomas Hay and Samuel M. Hay, Jr. The Dennis family absorbed the Covington paper and the Hay family absorbed the Conyers and Lithonia  papers in 1957.  Upon the death of Belmont Dennis in December 1961, his widow became editor and co-publisher with Mrs. Mallard.  In 1974 Leo S. Mallard became president and editor.

In 1983, the newspaper was sold to the company's employees, who owned it for three years.  In 1986 it was sold to Morris Multimedia of Savannah, Georgia.  The Covington News also publishes The News and Advertiser. In 2017, Patrick Graham purchased The Covington News from Morris Multimedia. Graham also owns The Walton Tribune in Monroe, Georgia; The Times-Journal in Fort Payne, Alabama; The Sentinel in Scottsboro, Alabama; and The Sand Mountain Reporter in Albertville, Alabama.

References
The Covington News

Morris Multimedia
Newspapers published in Georgia (U.S. state)
1865 establishments in Georgia (U.S. state)